Church Lake is a lake in Grant County, in the U.S. state of Minnesota.

Church Lake took its name from a church which stood near its shore.

References

Lakes of Minnesota
Lakes of Grant County, Minnesota